Enter the Queen is a 1930 British silent short comedy film directed by Arthur Varney and starring Richard Cooper, Dora March, Chili Bouchier and Percy Walsh.

It was made at Beaconsfield Studios as a quota quickie for distribution by Fox Film.

References

Bibliography
 Chibnall, Steve. Quota Quickies: The Birth of the British 'B' Film. British Film Institute, 2007.
 Low, Rachael. Filmmaking in 1930s Britain. George Allen & Unwin, 1985.
 Wood, Linda. British Films, 1927-1939. British Film Institute, 1986.

External links

1930 films
British silent short films
1930 comedy films
British black-and-white films
British comedy short films
Quota quickies
Films shot at Beaconsfield Studios
Films shot in Buckinghamshire
Fox Film films
1930s American films
1930s British films
Silent comedy films